Rebel Alliances: The Means and Ends of Contemporary British Anarchisms is a book-length study of philosophy applied to contemporary British class-struggle anarchism. Philosopher Benjamin Franks compares this tradition with competing political groups such as autonomist Marxism and describes a consistent, "ideal" anarchism.

References

External links 
 

2006 non-fiction books
AK Press books
Books about anarchism
Philosophy books
Anarchism in the United Kingdom
Anarchism in Scotland
Far-left politics in Scotland